Um Amor Infinito (English: "An Infinite Love") is the seventh studio album by Portuguese group Madredeus. It was released on 17 May 2004 by EMI-Valentim de Carvalho.

Recording 
Um Amor Infinito was recorded in February 2004 at the Xangrilá Studios in Lisbon, Portugal. The mixing was done at the Garate Studios in San Sebastian, Spain, in March 2004.

Track listing

Personnel 
Credits are adapted from the album's inner notes.

Madredeus

 Teresa Salgueiro – voice
 Pedro Ayres Magalhães – classic guitar
 José Peixoto – classic guitar
 Carlos Maria Trindade – synthesizers
 Fernando Júdice – acoustic bass

Production

 Pedro Ayres Magalhães – production, musical direction, cover concept
 Jorge Barata – sound engineer
 Pedro Rego – assistant technician at Xangrilá Studios
 Hartiz Harreguy – assistant technician at Garate Studios
 Tim Young – mastering
 Daniel Blaufuks – photography
 Paulo Junqueiro – executive production
 Maria João Fortes – executive production
 Helena Evangelista – executive production

Charts

References 

Madredeus albums
EMI Records albums
2004 albums